The 2020 Louisiana Democratic presidential primary took place on Saturday, July 11, 2020, in the Democratic Party presidential primaries for the 2020 presidential election. The Louisiana primary is a closed primary, with the state awarding 61 delegates, of which 54 are pledged delegates allocated on the basis of the results of the primary.

Early voting for the 2020 Democratic primary in Louisiana will take place statewide at a date to be determined.

The primary was initially scheduled for April 4. However, on March 13, 2020, the Secretary of State of Louisiana chose to postpone the state's primaries until June 20 due to the COVID-19 pandemic.  On April 14, the primary was further delayed another three weeks to July 11. These delays would have resulted in Louisiana losing half of its delegates, as the primary date is "past a June 9 deadline set by the Democratic National Committee", but there will be no penalty as the 2020 Democratic National Convention was rescheduled to August.

Procedure
Louisiana was initially planned to be one of three states holding primaries on April 4, 2020, the other two being Alaska and Hawaii. On June 20, 2019, governor John Bel Edwards signed a bill consolidating the presidential primary with municipal and ward elections on the same date, shifting the primary date from the first Saturday in March to the first Saturday in April.

Voting is expected to take place throughout the state from 6:00 a.m. until 8:00 p.m. In the closed primary, candidates must meet a threshold of 15 percent at the congressional district or statewide level in order to be considered viable. The 54 pledged delegates to the 2020 Democratic National Convention will be allocated proportionally on the basis of the results of the primary. Of the 54 pledged delegates, between 3 and 8 are allocated to both of the state's 6 congressional districts and another 7 are allocated to party leaders and elected officials (PLEO delegates), in addition to 12 at-large pledged delegates. These delegate totals do not account for pledged delegate bonuses or penalties from timing or clustering.

Following the primary, district-level delegates will be elected at post-primary congressional district caucuses featuring mail-in balloting. The Democratic state central committee will then meet to vote on the 12 pledged at-large and 7 PLEO delegates to send to the Democratic National Convention. The 54 pledged delegates Louisiana sends to the national convention will be joined by 7 unpledged PLEO delegates (5 members of the Democratic National Committee; a sole U.S. Representative in Cedric Richmond; and the governor).

Results

See also
 Impact of the COVID-19 pandemic on politics

References

External links
The Green Papers delegate allocation summary
Louisiana Democratic Party draft delegate selection plan

Louisiana Democratic
Democratic primary
2020
Louisiana Democratic primary, 2020